"" is the national anthem of Madagascar. The lyrics were written by Pasteur Rahajason, and the music by Norbert Raharisoa. It is similar to a march and was strongly influenced by European music and the French colonial education system. It is often played by Malagasy musicians on the accordion.

The anthem was officially adopted on 27 April 1959 by the parliament of Madagascar prior to the official granting of independence on 26 June 1960. Philibert Tsiranana was Prime Minister of Madagascar during the creation of the anthem, and Michel Debré was the French Prime Minister during this time. The main focus of the anthem is love of the land, as well as thankfulness to God and an appeal to unity and loyalty under the nation.

History 
"Pastor" Rahajason is credited with writing the national anthem of Madagascar. He was a priest born in 1897 and died in 1971. He was influenced by the French colonial education system, the aim of which was to assimilate the colonised people and was part of the broader civilising mission. This system was designed to orient local Malagasy populations towards the French colonial project, promoting strong ties to the French language, as well as French civilisation, values and cultural preferences. The schools were often associated with various missionary organisations, imparting a strong religious education overtone, also accounting for Rahajason's exposure to Christianity and his subsequent decision to become a pastor.

Norbert Raharisoa is credited with composing the national anthem of Madagascar. Raharisoa was also a music teacher and professor. He was born in 1914 and died in 1963, shortly after the adoption of his composition. He was honoured for his contributions to Malagasy culture by being featured on the 40 franc postage stamp in 1967. Like his colleague Rahajason, Norbert Raharisoa was raised under the French colonial education system, which explains the colonial influence on the anthem.

The national anthem was officially adopted on 27 April 1959, approximately one year before Madagascar achieved independence from France, on 26 June 1960. The anthem was originally written in French and Malagasy.

Music
The anthem is written as a European-style march, consistent with many national anthems around the world. The march is traditionally a military style, with a strong and even beat, originally meant to help troops "march" in step while travelling.

The anthem betrays its colonial influence through the general absence of local musical styles and instrument types. Ron Emoff, professor of music and anthropology at OSU Newark, notes that the anthem is not played in the vakondra-zana style, which is the style of the ancestors' music, also known as a form of traditional music. Emoff also notes that the anthem is usually not played on the local instrument, the valiha. This is because the anthem replicates the same essential ingredients that European hymns use, which are themselves based on old religious and nationalistic hymns.

Lyrics

Analysis of lyrics 

Researcher Igor Cusack identified several themes under which national anthems generally fall: calls to awake, arise, or work for future progress; praise for what is already there; and/or thanks to God. Cusack defines anthems as essentially praise hymns to God, the nation, or a parental figure, in keeping with the European origin of anthems as hymns.

Writing about Madagascar, Cusack explains that it was influenced by its French colonial masters and featured the themes: blessed by God, God save our land/people, and a nonspecific love of their beloved land.

According to Cusack, the first stanza focuses on an all-encompassing love of the nation and the land. It opens with a collective remembrance and affection for the past and the ways of the past as represented by the ancestors and closes with a nationalistic promise of fidelity and loyalty to the nation.

Cusack states that the chorus is a prayer to the Creator, who is most likely the Christian God, based on Madagascar's French colonial legacy. It connects the present once again to the past of the ancestors and asks a general blessing of joy and happiness on the country and its people.

The third stanza, Cusack states, is a response to the beauty of Madagascar and the love of its citizens have for it. They affirm their connection to the nation and their desire to serve the nation with body, heart and soul.

The final stanza is said to reaffirm the love the Malagasy have for their beloved nation and ask blessings on it and its people by again referencing the Christian God.

Notes

References

External links

 Madagascar: Ry Tanindrazanay malala ô - Audio of the national anthem of Madagascar, with information and lyrics (archive link)

Malagasy culture
National symbols of Madagascar
African anthems
1958 songs
National anthem compositions in A-flat major